This list of Honorary Graduates of the University of Leeds is a year-by-year list of people recognized by the University of Leeds for their achievements in their given field with an honorary award.

An honorary degree or a degree honoris causa (Latin: 'for the sake of the honour') is an academic degree for which a university (or other degree-awarding institution) has waived the usual requirements (such as matriculation, residence, study and the passing of examinations). The degree itself is typically a doctorate or, less commonly, a master's degree, and may be awarded to someone who has no prior connection with the academic institution.

2020s
2022
 Nina Gualinga (LLD)
 Mark Tucker (LLD)
 Brenda Hale (LLD)
 David Grey (LLD)
 Eleanor Dodson (DSc)
 Alison Lowe (LLD)
 Rachel Skinner (LLD)
 Gillian Leng (DSc)

No honorary degrees were awarded in 2020 or 2021 due to the COVID-19 pandemic.

2010s
2019
 Peter Dhillon (LLD)
 Jane Featherstone (DLitt)
 Richard Henderson (DSc)
 Lubaina Himid (DLitt)
 Michael Pepper (DEng)
 Norman Williams (DSc)

2018
 Kenton Cool (LLD)
 Mary Fowler (DSc)
 Peter Gibbs (LLD)
 Gabriele Hegerl (DSc)
 Alice Roberts (DSc)
 Jane Rumble (DSc)
 Clare Marx (DSc)
 Wendy Burn (DM)
 Robert Mair, Baron Mair (DEng)
 Iain Mattaj (DSc)
 David Olusoga (DLitt)
 Anne Owers (LLD)
 Christopher Senyonjo (LLD)
 Leslie Valiant (DEng)

2017
 Malcolm Brown (LLD)
 Anne Chamberlain (DSc)
 Grace Clough (LLD)
 Barry Cryer (DLitt)
 Karen Darke (LLD)
 Richard Farnes (DMus)
 John Hardy (DSc)
 Colin Low (Baron Low of Dalston) (LLD)
 Nicola Mendelsohn (LLD)
 Helen Rappaport (DLitt)
 Martin Rees (Baron Rees of Ludlow) (DSc)
 Andrew Shovlin (DEng)
 Paul Workman (DSc)

2016
 Athene Donald (DSc)
 John Fisher (DEng)
 Anne-Marie Hutchinson (LLD)
 Steve Jackson (DSc)
 Vivien Jones (DLitt)
 Wayne McGregor (DLitt)
 Peter Morgan (DLitt)
 Isobel Pollock-Hulf (DEng)
 Julia Slingo (DSc)
 John Stoddart-Scott (LLD)
 Andrea Sutcliffe (DSc)

2015
 Nicola Adams (LLD)
 Simon Armitage (DLitt)
 David Baulcombe (DSc)
 Margaret Jull Costa (DLitt)
 Ann Dowling (DEng)
 Arthur France (LLD)
 Peter Hendy (LLD)
 Howard Morris (DSc)
 Michelle Pinggera (LLD)
 John Tooke (DSc)

2014
 Michael Arthur (LLD)
 John Dyson, Lord Dyson (LLD)
 Jane Francis (DSc)
 Andras Schiff (DMus)
 Patrick Stewart (DLitt)

2013
 Alistair Brownlee (LLD)
 Jonathan Brownlee (LLD)
 Claire Cashmore (LLD)
 Stephanie Flanders (DLitt)
 Samuel Kargbo (DSc)
 Linda Pollard (LLD)
 Susan Solomon (DSc)
 Martin Wainwright (DLitt)

2012
 Onora O’Neill (LLD)
 Eliza Manningham-Buller (LLD)
 Keir Starmer QC (LLD)
 Ian Kershaw (DLitt)

2011
 David Stuart (DSc)
 Corinne Bailey Rae (DMus)
 Jonathan Wild (LLD)
 Sally Davies (DM)
 Peter Blake (DMus)
 Keith Howard (LLD)

2010
 Alan Yentob (LLD)
 José Ángel Gurría (LLD)
 Elaine Surick Oran (DSc)
 Ingrid Roscoe (LLD)
 John Sentamu (LLD)
 John Simpson (LLD)
 Lesley Dixon (LLD)
 Sir Stuart Rose (LLD)

2000s

2009
 Sayyid Saud bin Ibrahim Al-Busaidi (LLD)
 Yahya bin Saud bin Mansoor Al-Sulaimi (LLD)
 Nicola Brewer (LLD)
 Malcolm Chaikin (DSc)
 Bekele Geleta (LLD)
 Simon Mason (LLD)
 Sunil Bharti Mittal (LLD)
 Richard Mantle (DMus)
 Michael Nyman (DMus)
 Lord Oxburgh of Liverpool (DSc)
 Peter Robinson (DLitt)

2008

 Mark Byford (LLD)
 Albert Fert (DSc)
 Baroness Flather (LLD)
 David Hessayon (DSc)
 Sir Christopher Rose (LLD)
 Martin Scicluna (LLD)
 Polly Toynbee (LLD)

2007

 David Ansbro (LLD)
 Dame Josephine Barstow (DMus)
 Steve Bell (DLitt)
 Dr Sydney Brenner (DM)
 Arthur Cockcroft (LLD)
 Anita Desai (DLitt)
 Ruth Errington (LLD)
 Al Garthwaite (LLD)
 Mabel Parris (LLD)
 Harold Pinter (DLitt)
 Dr Piers Sellers (DSc)
 Professor Janet Thornton (DSc)
 Fiona Wood (DM)
 Tony Wren (DEng)

2006

 Lynne Brindley (DLitt)
 Gurinder Chadha (DLitt)
 Sara Courtneidge (DSc)
 John Elderfield (DLitt)
 Alexander Markham (DSc)
 Arthur Stone (LLD)

2005

 Bill Bryson (DLitt)
 Sir David Cox (DSc)
 Andy Kershaw (DMus)
 Dame Nancy Rothwell (DSc)
 Marjorie Ziff (LLD)

2004

 Zygmunt Bauman (Emeritus Professor)
 Maurice Beresford (Emeritus Professor)
 Jack Charlton (LLD)
 Duncan Dowson (Emeritus Professor)
 Tony Harrison (DLitt)
 Professor Dame Julia Higgins (DSc)
 Sir Ian McKellen (DLitt)
 Sir Kenneth Morrison (LLD)
 Baroness Usha Prashar (LLD)
 Professor David Rhodes (DEng)
 Ngugi wa Thiong'o (DLitt)
 Professor Sir Alan Wilson (LLD)

2003

 Anthony Hunt (DEng)
 Caryl Phillips (DLitt)

2002
 Dame Judi Dench (DLitt)
 Roderic Lyne (LLD)
 Paul Nurse (DSc)

2001
 Dame Betty Boothroyd (LLD)
 Susan Greenfield (DSc)
 Seamus Heaney (DLitt)
 Craig Jordan (DMed)

2000
 Melvyn Bragg (DLitt)
 Alan Bullock (DLitt)
 Jocelyn Bell Burnell (DSc)
 David Hockney (Dlitt)
 Jude Kelly (DLitt)
 Robert Ogden (LLD)
 Alan Roberts (LLD)

1990s

1999
 Jeremy Paxman (LLD)
 Murray Perahia (DMus)
 The Rt. Hon. Jack Straw (LLD)
 Professor Sir John Ernest Walker (DSc)

1998
 No honors conferred in this academic year.

1997

 Harold 'Dickie' Bird (LLD)
 Ben Gill (DSc)
 Peter Gray (DSc)
 John Hougham (LLD)
 Douglas Jefferson (DLitt)
 Bill Kilgallon (LLD)
 Gerald Di Piazza (DEng)
 Derek Roberts (DSc)
 Nayantara Saghal (DLitt)
 Richard Sykes (DSc)

1996

 James Cronin (DSc)
 Vigdís Finnbogadóttir (LLD)
 Ernest Hall (LLD)
 David Jenkins (DD)
 Sir Jonathan Wolfe Miller (DLitt)
 Dame Kathleen Raven (LDD)
 Ismail Zawawi (DEng)

1995

 Sir Alan Bowness (DLitt)
 Stuart Hall (DLitt)
 Sir John Houghton (DSc)
 Tom Jackson (LLD)
 Mark Knopfler (DMus)
 Professor Sir Hans Leo Kornberg (DSc)
 Lin Ma (LLD)
 Jean Muir (DLitt)
 Manmohan Singh (LLD)
 Lord Justice Taylor, Baron Taylor of Gosforth (LLD)
 Chad Varah (LLD)

1994

 Emeka Anyaoku (LLD)
 Margaret Atwood (DLitt)
 Lydia Dunn, Baroness Dunn (LLD)
 Sir Sam Edwards (DSc)
 Professor Sir Gordon Higginson (LLD)
 The Honorable Raymond George Hardenbergh Seitz (LLD)
 Cecil Thompson (MA)
 Victor Watson (LLD)

1993
 The Rt Rev (Albert) Kenneth Cragg (DD)
 Maurice Godet (DEng)
 Anish Kapoor (DLitt)
 Dame Anne Laura Dorinthea McLaren (DSc)
 Sir Simon Denis Rattle (DMus)
 Edward Thompson (DLitt)
 Dr. James Walsh (LLD)
 Arnold Ziff (LLD)

1992

 Sir Frederick Charles Frank (DSc)
 Professor Stephen Jay Gould (DSc)
 Raymond Head (LLD)
 Prince Sadruddin Aga Khan (LLD)
 Professor Dan McKenzie (DSc)
 Cristopher Mowll (LLD)
 David Terence Puttnam, Baron Puttnam (DLitt)
 Merlyn Rees, Baron Merlyn-Rees (LLD)
 Dame Enid Diana Elizabeth Rigg (DLitt)
 Dame Fanny Waterman (DMus)

1991
 The Rt. Hon. Denis Healey, Baron Healey (LLD)
 Rev. Trevor Huddlestone (LLD)
 Professor Walter Kunzel (DM)
 Sir Gordon Linacre (LDD)
 Janusz Onyszkiewicz (DSc)
 Pat Solk (LLD)
 Sir Peter Thompson (LLD)

1990
 Alan Bennett (DLitt)
 Barbara Taylor Bradford (DLitt)
 Lt Cdr. Allan Crockatt (LDD)
 Ray Cullingworth (MA)
 Ralph Goodall (DEng)
 Professor Yves Jeannin (DSc)
 Sir Gustav Victor Joseph Nossal (DM)
 Colin Sampson (LLD)
 Tōru Takemitsu (DMus)
 Sir Erik Christopher Zeeman (DSc)

1980s

1989
 Joseph Dickinson (MSc)
 Sir Joseph Gilbert (LLD)
 H Peter Jost (DEng)
 Professor Heinrich Noth (DSc)
 Tan Sri Rashdan (LLD)
 Esther Simpson (LLD)
 Caspar Weinberger (DM)

1988

 Doreen J Bayley (MA)
 Professor Richard Cobb (DLitt)
 Geoffrey Hill (DLitt)
 Susan Cunliffe-Lister, Dowager Countess of Swinton, Baroness Masham of Ilton (LLD)
 Roy McMurtry (LLD)
 Patricia Ruanne (DLitt)
 William P Thackray (LLD)
 Jean M Tyrrell (LLD)
 Professor Sir David Weatherall (DM)

1987

 Jack Ashley, Baron Ashley of Stoke (LLD)
 Sir Alan Ayckbourn (DLitt)
 Sir Lawrence Byford (LLD)
 Bernard Haitink (DMus)
 Professor Stephen Hawking (DSc)
 Professor Jerzy Kroh (DSc)
 Yves Lesage (LLD)
 Anthony J Moyes (LLD)
 Dame Margaret Kate Weston (DSc)

1986

 Professor Sir Geoffrey Allen (DSc)
 The Reverend Professor William Owen Chadwick (DLitt)
 Janusz Fibras (DLitt)
 David Lloyd-Jones (DMus)
 Sir David Lean (DLitt)
 Sir James Wilson Vincent Savile (LLD) – revoked 2012
 Noel Stockdale (LLD)

1985

 Douglas Gabb (MEng)
 Emeritus Professor Irene Manton (DSc)
 Ronald King Murray, Lord Murray (LLD)
 John Piper (DLitt)
 Professor Robert Shackleton (DLitt)
 Douglas Shortridge (LLD)
 The Rt. Rev. Gordon Wheeler (DD)
 Xie Xide (DSc)

1984

 Julian Bream (DMus)
 Professor Brian Leonard Clarkson (DSc)
 Richard Arthur Dalley (MSc)
 James Hanson, Baron Hanson (LLD)
 Sir Paul Leonard Fox (LLD)
 Sir Stanley George Hooker (DSc)
 Syed Ali Mohammed Husain Khusro (LLD)
 Emeritus Professor Owen Lattimore (DLitt)
 Sir James Lighthill (DSc)
 Sir Rex Richards (DSc)
 R. E. Rowe (DEng)
 Margaret Susan Cheshire, Baroness Ryder of Warsaw and Baroness Cheshire (LLD)
 Emeritus Professor William Walsh (LLD)
 James Westoll (LLD)

1983

 Imogen Clare Holst (DMus)
 George Thomas, 1st Viscount Tonypandy of Rhondda (LLD)
 Robert Stewart Rowe (DLitt)
 Roy Colin Strong (DLitt)

1982

 Stephen Towers Anning (MPhil)
 Willy Brandt (LLD)
 Denis Parsons Burkitt
 Sir Henry Chilver, Baron Chilver (DSc)
 Jacqueline du Pré (DMus)
 Derek Ezra, Baron Ezra (LLD)
 Viscount Hailsham (LLD)
 Ronald Stanley Illingworth (DSc)
 Leo Arthur Kaprio (LLD)
 Emmanuel Le Roy Ladurie (DLitt)
 Sir Rudolph Lyons (LLD)

1981
 Peter Carington, 6th Baron Carrington (LLD)
 Professor David Donnison (LLD)
 Sarah Gilchrist (MA)
 Robert Gittings (DLitt)
 Jean Philippe Inebnit (MA)
 Sir Alec Merrison (DSc)
 Richard Morris (DSc)
 Norah Smallwood (DLitt)

1980
 Dame Janet Abbott Baker (DMus)
 The Very Reverend Henry Chadwick (DD)
 John Cedric Goligher (DSc)
 James MacGregor (LLD)
 Sir Denis Rooke (DSc)
 Sir Tom Stoppard (DLitt)
 The Rt. Hon. Mrs Shirley Williams, Baroness Williams of Crosby (LLD)

1970s
1979
 S.P.S. Andrew (DSc)
 Sir Robert Bradlaw (DSc)
 Baron Diamond of Gloucester (LLD)
 Professor M.E. Howard (DLitt)
 Dennis Irvine (DSc)
 Queenie Dorothy Leavis (DLitt)
 Lord Hunt of Llanvair Waterdine (DLitt)
 Baroness Seear (LLD)
 E.J. Read (MA)
 Sydney Percy Smith (DSc)
 William Taylor (DLitt)
 Professor Sir John Walton (DSc)

1978
 Reinhard Bendix (DLitt)
 Baron Holderness of Bishop Wilton in the County (LLD)
 Sir John Charnley (DSc)
 Kristján Eldjárn, President of Iceland (DLitt)
 Professor Philip Grierson (DLitt)
 Dr Theodore Morris Sugden (DSc)
 Clement Charles Tapp (MA)
 Lord Arnold Weinstock (DLitt)
 Richard F Wood (DLitt)

1977

 Sir Kenneth Lyon Blaxter (DSc)
 Professor Sheppard Sunderland Frere (DLitt)
 Arthur Koestler (DLitt)
 Professor William Norton Medlicott (DLitt)
 Sir Claus Moser (PhD)
 Innocentina Tomasini Pearmain (MA)
 Lord Alexander of Potterhill (DLitt)
 John Collins Siddons (MSc)
 Edmund Williamson (LLD)

1976
 Claude Thomas Bissell (DLitt)
 Aaron Copland (DMus)
 Norma Franklin (DSc)
 Margaret Gowing (DLitt)
 Helena Hayward (MA)
 Prince Edward, Duke of Kent (LLD)
 Charles Rosen (DMus)
 Sir Rodney Smith (DSc)
 Lord Widgery (LLD)

1975
 Rupert Cross (LLD)
 Kenneth Fourness (MSc)
 Donald Hunt (DMus)
 Harold Macmillan (DLitt)
 Rosemary Murray (DSc)
 Charles Pannell (LLD)
 David Woodbine Parish (LLD)
 Stephen Roskill (DLitt)
 Arnold Smith (LLD)
 Professor Sir John Stallworthy (DSc)
 Humphrey Trevelyan (DLitt)
 Emeritus Professor Ronald Tunbridge (Dsc)
 Ralph C Yablon (LLD)

1974
 Pierre Boulez (DMus)
 Asa Briggs (DLitt)
 Richard Crossman (DLitt)
 Arthur Dower (LLD)
 Sir Reginald Goodall (DMus)
 David Hockney (MA)
 Sir Brynmor Jones (LLD)
 Alexander MacLennan (MEd)
 Frederick Sidney Snow (LLD)
 Andre Varga (LLD)

1973
 Kenneth John Bonser (MA)
 Sir John Francis Boyd (LLD)
 Arnold Stanley Vincent Burgen (DSc)
 George Sidney Roberts Kitson Clark (DLitt)
 Professor Sir Frederick Sidney Dainton (DSc)
 Jean Esther Floud (DLitt)
 Arthur Gilpin (MSc)
 Professor Sydney Goldstein (DSc)
 Harold Gray (LLD)
 Bernard Lyons (LLD)
 George Frederick Sedgwick (MA)
 Wole Soyinka (DLitt)
 Professor Julius Stone (LLD)

1972
 Baroness Bacon (Alice Martha) (LLD)
 Lady Barbirolli (Evelyn Rothwell) (MA)
 Nadia Boulanger (DMus)
 Sir Colin Douglas Buchanan (DSc)
 Sir Alec Clegg (LLD)
 Professor V.L. Ginzburg (DLitt)
 Vaughan Loach (LLD)
 Arthur Stanley Maney (MA)
 Victor Sawdon Pritchett (DLitt)
 Arthur Raistrick (DLitt)
 Baron Butler of Saffron Walden (DLitt)
 Professor Helmut Zahn (DSc)

1971
 Hugh Foot, Baron Caradon(LLD)
 Sir Ronald Gould (DLitt)
 The Rt. Hon. Roy Jenkins (LLD)
 Sir Donald MacDougall (DLitt)
 Professor Sir George Porter (DSc)
 Georg Solti (DMus)
 Sir Roger Stevens (LLD)
 Dorothy Whitelock (DLitt)
 Professor Rudolf Wittkower (DLitt)

1970
 Lord Crowther of Headingley (DLitt)
 Clifford Curzon (DMus)
 Alexander Graeme Dickson (LLD)
 Kenneth Hargreaves (LLD)
 Sir Howard Lesley Kirkley (MA)
 Robert Lowell (DLitt)
 William Pitts (MA)
 Professor Tadeus Reichstein (DSc)
 Professor Bazaryn Shirendyb (DLitt)
 Professor Henri Talon (DLitt)
 Dame Janet Maria Vaughan (DSc)

1960s
1969
 Professor Philip Rowland Allison (DSc)
 Professor Damaso Alonso (DLitt)
 Frank Beckwith (MPhil)
 The Hon. Sir Maurice (Richard) Bridgeman, K.B.E. (LLD)
 Sir Derman (Guy) Christopherson (LLD)
 James Richard Gregson (MA)
 Donald Hopewell (LLD)
 Professor Sir Fred Hoyle (DSc)
 Sir Bernard Kenyon (LLD) Walter Pagel (LLD)
 Dowager Marchioness of Reading (LLD)
 Elizabeth Grace Watts (LLD)

1968
 Douglas Crockatt (LLD)
 Marie Hartley (MA)
 Harold Himsworth (DSc)
 Archer John Porter Martin (DSc)
 Davidson Sylvester Hector Willoughby Nicol (LLD)
 Nikolaus Pevsner (DLitt)
 Pierre-Paul Schweitzer (LLD)
 Eric Treacy (LLD)
 Lady Dorothy Tunbridge (MA)
 Sir Ernest George Woodroofe (LLD)

1967
 David William Currie (DSc)
 Sir Frank Francis (DLitt)
 King Gustaf VI Adolf of Sweden (LLD)
 Lord Jackson of Burnley (LLD)
 Sir Henry Jones (LLD)
 David Henry Lewis (MSc)
 Dame Kathleen Lonsdale (LLD)
 John Primatt Redcliffe Maud (LLD)
 Robert Mayer (LLD)
 Irene McAdam (MA)
 Mary Moorman (DLitt)
 Rasipuram Krishnaswamy Narayan (LLD)
 Jean-Paul Sartre (DLitt)
 Salimuzzaman Siddiqui (DSc)
 Julius Adams Stratton (LLD)
 U. Thant (LLD)
 Emeritus Professor Henry Cherry Versey (LLD)
 Joshua Samuel Alderman Walsh (LLD)
 Sir William Worsley (LLD)
 Sir Norman Wright (LLD)

1966
 Air Vice-Marshal Geoffrey Hill Ambler (LLD)
 David Curie (MSc)
 Baroness Gaitskell of Egremont (LLD)
 Sir Frank Kearton (LLD)
 HRH Duchess of Kent (LLD)
 Emeritus Professor Alfred Charles Bernard Lovell (DSc)
 Sir Alexander Oppenheim (LLD)
 Lord Stewart of Fulham (LLD)
 Mr Justice Geoffrey De Paiva Veale (LLD)
 Dame Fanny Waterman (MA)

1965
 Professor Saul Alder (DSc)
 Lord Edward Boyle (LLD)
 Lord Brock (LLD)
 Professor Sir Ernst Hans Josef Gombrich (DLitt)
 Sir Charles Illingworth (LLD)
 Frank Leavis (DLitt)
 Shrimati Hansa Mehta (LLD)
 Ronald George Wreyford Norrish (DSc)
 Professor Johannes Franciscus Nuboer (LLD)
 Frederick Oppenheim (LLD)
 Henry Platt (LLD)
 Emeritus Professor Leslie Norman Pyrah (DSc)
 Sir Michael Kent Tippett (DMus)
 Canon Rowland John Wood (MA)

1964
 Elsa M. Carroll (MA)
 Harry Dawson (MA)
 Margaretha Albertina Maria Klompe (LLD)
 Sir Hans Krebs (DSc)
 Sir Simon Marks (LLD)
 Sir Harry Melville (DSc)
 Rt. Rev. John Moorman (DLitt)
 Baron Morris of Grasmere (LLD)
 W.T. Oliver (MA)
 A.D. Waley (DLitt)
 Leslie G Wilson (LLD)

1963
 Professor Alfred Gustave Herbert Bachrach (DLitt)
 Ralph Chislett (MSc)
 Charles Henry Crabtree (LLD)
 Frank Dawtry (MA)
 Lord Denning (LLD)
 Kenneth Onwuka Dike (LLD)
 Frederick George Baxendale Hutchings (MA)
 Col. Geoffrey Kitson (LLD)
 Lord Lever (LLD)
 Lady Mary Helen Oglivie (LLD)

1962
 Professor William Beare (LLD)
 Eirikur Benedikz (MA)
 Lord Patrick Maynard Stuart Blackett (DSc)
 Professor Edmund Charles Blunden (DLitt)
 Sir Christopher Cox (LLD)
 Charles William Duncombe (LLD)
 Sir Harry Hylton-Foster (LLD)
 Louis Harold Gray (DSc)
 Alexander Hollaender (DSc)
 Professor Alexander Mikhajlovich Kuzin (DSc)
 Raymond Laterjet (DSc)
 Professor Konrad Zacharias Lorenz (DSc)
 Alva Myrdal (DLitt)
 Professor Willem Jacob Verdenius (LLD)
 Very Rev. Eric Milner-White (DLitt)

1961
 Arthur Richard Baines (LLD)
 Professor Adolph Butenandt (DSc)
 Professor Richard Lester Cahn (DSc)
 James Percy Cocker (M.Ch.D)
 Sir Henry Hallett Dale (DSc)
 Sir Ronald Aylmer Fisher (DSc)
 Sir John Hammond (DSc)
 Barbara Hepworth (DLitt)
 William Jones (LLD)
 Professor Charles MacAfee (DSc)
 Sir Robert Menzies (LLD)
 Sir Jeremy Raisman (LLD)
 Sir James Wilson Robertson (LLD)
 Rev. Norman Snaith (DLitt)
 Martha Steinitz (MA)
 Professor Jens Waerhaug (DSc)

1960
 Ivy Compton-Burnett (DLitt)
 Barker Thomas Clegg (LLD)
 Philip Gooding (MSc)
 Sir Edwin Herbert (LLD)
 William Colley Monckton Matterson (MSc)
 Sir John Neale (DLitt)
 Sir George Sansom (DLitt)

1950s
1959
 Professor Alfred Ewert (DLitt)
 Sir Edward Hale (LLD)
 Earl of Harewood (LLD)
 Sir George Raymond Hinchcliffe (LLD)
 Dorothy Crowfoot Hodgkin (DSc)
 Sir Rudolph Peters (DSc)
 Jonas Edward Salk (DSc)
 Sir Phillip Manderson Sherlock (LLD)
 Sir Harold Smith (LLD)
 Norma Sykes (DLitt)

1958
 Professor Oene Bottema (LLD)
 Mary Lucy Cartwright (DSc)
 Frederick Donald Coggan (DD)
 Professor Sir John G Edwards (DLitt)
 Professor Peter Racine Fricker (DMus)
 William Harrison (LLD)
 George Kirk (MA)
 Professor Walter Von Wartburg (DLitt)

1957
 Lord Janner (LLD) Sir Ivor Jennings (LLD)
 Margaret Mead (DSc)
 Professor Gunnar Myrdal (LLD)
 Lord Ramsey of Canterbury (DD)
 Mary Stocks (LLD)
 E.W. Taylor (DSc)
 Lord Weeks (LLD)

1956
 Alderman/Cuthbert Lowell Ackroyd (LLD)
 Sir John Douglas Cockcroft (DSc)
 James Bryant Conant (LLD)
 Sir George Dyson (LLD)
 James Digby Firth (MA)
 Walter Freudenberg (DSc)
 Vijaya Lakshmi Pandit (LLD)
 The Rt. Rev. Arthur Reeve (DD)
 Professor Sir Ian Richmond (DLitt)
 Edward Rickerby (MA)
 Sir Oliver Graham Sutton (DSc)

1955
 Sir William Linton Andrews (DSc)
 Major Philip Maurice Beachcroft (LLD)
 Sydney Clayton Fryers (MA)
 Lord Middleton (LLD)
 Emeritus Professor William Milne (LLD)
 Edwin Muir (DLitt)
 John Henry Nicholson (LLD)
 Dorothy Phillips (LLD)
 Joseph Slepian (DSc)
 Professor Bruno Snell (DLitt)

1954
 Duchess of Devonshire (widow of 10th Duke) (LLD)
 Her Majesty Queen Elizabeth the Queen Mother (LLD)
 Professor Evarts Ambrose Graham (LLD)
 The Rt. Hon. John Hindley (LLD)
 Sir David Owen (LLD)
 Professor Wilder Graves Penfield (LLD)
 Fred Rankin (LLD)
 Sir Harry Shackleton (LLD)
 Sir Arthur Trueman (LLD)
 Sir Cecil Wakeley (LLD)

1953
 Professor John Baker (DSc)
 Goodwin Batterson Beach (DLitt)
 Professor Petrus Johannes Enk (DLitt)
 Margot Fonteyn (DLitt)
 Eugene Freyssinet (DSc)
 Thomas Girtin (LLD)
 Eric Craven Gregory (LLD)
 Professor Charles Huggins (DSc)
 Professor Christopher Kelk Ingold (DSc)
 Cyril Meggitt (MA)
 Lord Milner of Leeds (LLD)
 Alfred Prior (MA)
 William Hunter Rose (MSc)
 Viscount Herbert Louis Samuel (DLitt)
 Percy Scholes (DLitt)
 Ronald Ogier Ward (DSc)
 John Wilkinson (MSc)

1952
 Albert Herman Aldridge (LLD)
 Professor Marius Adolphus Van Bouwdijk Bastiaanse (LLD)
 Ernest Green (LLD)
 Sir Cyril Hinshelwood (DSc)
 Sir Eardley Holland (LLD)
 Wyndham Lewis (DLitt)
 Arthur Ransome (DLitt)
 William Riley-Smith (LLD)
 Sir James Turner (LLD)

1951
 Alderman David Beevers (LLD)
 Viscountess Margaret Boyne (LLD)
 Kathleen Chambers (LLD)
 The Rt. Rev. George Armitage Chase (DD)
 Lady Helen Cynthia Colville (LLD)
 Dame Julia Myra Hess (LLD)
 Sir Hubert Houldsworth (LLD)
 Sir John Huggins (LLD)
 John James Ilett (MA)
 Gertrude Illingworth (MA)
 James Laybourn (MA)
 Dame Hilda Nora Lloyd (LLD)
 Thomas Lodge (DLitt)
 The Rt. Hon. Lawrence Lumley (LLD)
 Sir George Martin (LLD)
 John Morrell (LLD)
 The Rt. Hon. Angela Pery (LLD)
 Brigadier James Noel Tetley (LLD)

1950
 Sir Robert Birley (LLD)
 Lord (David) Cecil (DLitt)
 Lord (Francis Raymond) Evershed (LLD)
 Professor Barker Fairley (DLitt)
 Emeritus Professor Robert Whytlaw-Gray (DSc)
 Alexander Lindsay (LLD)
 Louis Harold Mountbatten (LLD)
 William Pickles (DSc)
 Major Walter Pothecary (LLD)

1940s
1949
 Phyllis Eleanor Bentley (DLitt)
 Professor James Couper Brash (DSc)
 Sir James Chadwick (DSc)
 General Dwight David Eisenhower (LLD)
 Arnold Trevor Green (DSc)
 Bernard Jones (LLD)
 Dame Lillian Penson (LLD)
 Emile Victor Rieu (DLitt)

1948
 Lewis William Douglas (LLD)
 Sir Percival Hartley (DSc)
 Rev. William Hughes (DD)
 Lord MacKintosh of Halifax (LLD)
 Dame Edith Sitwell (DLitt)
 Sir Bracewell Smith (LLD)
 Terry Thomas (LLD)

1947
 Charles Frederick Ratcliffe Brotherton (LLD)
 Professor Henry Buckley Charlton (DLitt)
 Andrew Browne Cunningham (LLD)
 Lt. General Sir William George Dobbie (LLD)
 Wilfred Joseph Halliday (PhD)
 Thomas Edmund Harvey (LLD)
 Lt. Col. Sir John Alexander Dunnington-Jefferson (LLD)
 Henry Mahony (PhD)
 Professor Sigurður Nordal (DLitt)
 Michael Polanyi (DSc)
 William Goodwin Senior (PhD)
 Croydon Whittaker (DSc)

1946
 Herbert Vere Evatt (LLD)
 The Viscount Leathers (LLD)
 Sir Frederick Pile (LLD)
 Lord (William) Slim (LLD)
 Arthur Tedder (LLD)
 Lord Waverley (LLD)

1945
 Sir Robert Anthony Eden (LLD)
 Elinor G. Lupton (LLD)
 Henry Moore (DLitt)
 James Francis Tait
 George Thompson (MA)
 Sir Henry Tizard (DSc)
 Gerard Veale (LLD)

1944
 Gordon Bottomley (DLitt)
 Sir Montague Burton (LLD)
 Jessie Kitson (LLD)
 Harold Whitaker (PhD)
 Sir Percy Winfield (LLD)

1943
 Col. Hugh Delabere Bousfield (LLD)
 Sir Charles Travis Clay (DLitt)
 Edward Victor Evans (DSc)
 Rev. Cyril Forester Garbett (DD)
 Margaret Storm Jameson (DLitt)
 Henry Raper (LLD)

1942
 John Winant (LLD)

1941
 Emeritus Professor Paul Barbier (DLitt)
 Emeritus Professor John William Cobb (DSc)
 Emeritus Professor Alexander Thompson (LLD)

1930s
1939
 Stanley Baldwin (LLD)
 Sir William Lawrence Bragg (DSc)
 Edward William Cavendish (LLD)
 John Whelan Dulanty (LLD)
 Sir Arthur Stanley Eddington (DSc)
 Thomas Stearns Eliot (DLitt)
 Dowager Countess of Halifax (LLD)
 Sir William Holdsworth (DLitt)
 John Edward Humphery (LLD)
 John Kirk (PhD)
 Sir John Charles Ledingham (DSc)
 Rev. Charles Lunt (DD)
 Sir Charles McGrath (LLD)
 William Morrison (LLD)
 Frank Parkinson (LLD)
 Leonard Rowden (DSc)
 Sir Frank Stenton (DLitt)
 Sir John Stopford (DSc)
 Rev. Vincent Taylor (DD)

1938
 Rupert Beckett (LLD)
 William Sawney Bisat (MSc)
 Arthur Neville Chamberlain (LLD)
 Cecil John Turrell Cronshaw (DSc)
 Professor Alfred Fowler (DSc)
 Professor Edmund Johnston Garwood (DSc)
 Giovanni Gentile (DLitt)
 Walter Parsons (PhD)

1937
 Lord George Ranken Askwith (LLD)
 Viscount Stanley Melbourne Bruce of Melbourne (LLD)
 Professor George Stuart Gordon (DLitt)
 Professor John Jamieson (LLD)
 Joseph Jones (LLD)
 Rev. Frederick Wiseman (DLitt)

1936
 Sir Edward Bairstow (DMus)
 John Jeremy Brigg (LLD)
 Raymond Wilson Chambers (DLitt)
 Sir Henry Herbert Craster (DLitt)
 Henry Drysdale Dakin (LLD)
 Richard James Gordon (MA)
 Professor Arthur Berriedale Keith (LLD)
 Professor Frederic Stanley Kipping (DSc)
 Henry Lanchester (DLitt)
 Langford Price (LLD)
 Sir Josiah Stamp (LLD)
 Norman Walker (MSc)

1935
 Professor Harvey Cushing (DSc)
 Walter Elliot (LLD)
 Rev. Canon George Garrod (PhD)
 The Earl of Harewood (Henry Lascelles) (LLD)
 Ernest Rutherford (DSc)
 Emeritus Professor William Stroud (DSc)

1934
 Sir Robert Wilfred De Yarburgh Bateson (LLD)
 Emeritus Professor Joseph Shaw Bolton (DSc)
 Professor John Harold Clapham (DLitt)
 Beryl Katherine Gott (LLD)
 Sir Henry Stuart- Jones (DLitt)
 Arthur Mann (LLD)
 Sir Robert Muir (DSc)
 Elizabeth Mary Wright (DLitt)

1933
 Francis Askew (LLD)
 Frederick Delius (DLitt)
 Frank Elgee (PhD)
 Emeritus Professor Arthur James Grant (DLitt)
 Sir Charles Peers (DLitt)
 Sir John Simon (LLD)
 Col. Charles Harold Tetley (LLD)
 Sir Joseph Thomson (DSc)
 Elizabeth Winfield (MA)
 Henry Worth (MSc)

1932
 Sir James Hinchcliffe (LLD)
 Osbert John Howarth (PhD)
 Dame Ellen Musson (LLD)
 Professor Sir Herbert Read (DLitt)

1931
 Emeritus Professor Alfred George Barrs (LLD)
 Bertrand Dawson (LLD)
 Sir Walter Morley Fletcher (DSc)
 Arthur Hawkyard (LLD)
 Sir Frederick Hopkins (DSc)
 Sir George Newman (LLD)
 Sir John Bland-Sutton (LLD)
 Jane Harriett Walker (LLD)

1930
 Henry Crowther (MSc)
 Arthur Greenwood (LLD)
 Sir William Hadow (DLitt)
 Walter Hargreaves (LLD)
 Sir Owen Richardson (DSc)
 Rev. William Temple (LLD)
 Sir Henry Walker (LLD)

1920s
1929
 William Edwards (DLitt)
 Sir Algernon Freeman Firth (LLD)
 Rt. Rev. Walter Howard Frere (DLitt)
 Emeritus Professor Thomas Griffith (DSc)
 Lucy Lowe (DLitt)
 Charles Mayo (DSc)

1928
 Sir Albert Ernest Bain (LLD)
 Alexander Campbell (LLD)
 Edwin Kitson Clark (LLD)
 Evelyn Cavendish, Duchess of Devonshire (LLD)
 Morton Latham (LLD)
 Walter Marston (MSc)
 Charles Onions (DLitt)
 Charles Rippon (PhD)
 William Thorburn (MSc)
 The Rt. Hon. Henry Whitley (LLD)

1927
 Katharine Stewart-Murray, Duchess of Atholl (LLD)
 Fred Barraclough (MA)
 Frederick Orpen Bower (DSc)
 Thomas Robinson Ferens (LLD)
 James Graham (PhD)
 John Scott Haldane (DSc)
 Sir Arthur Keith (LLD)
 Robert Millikan (DSc)
 Sir Charles Parsons (LLD)
 Emeritus Professor Arthur Perkin (DSc)
 Sir James Roberts (LLD)
 Professor Nevil Sidgwick (DSc)
 Philip Snowden (LLD)

1926
 Emeritus Professor Percy Kendall (DSc)
 Sir David Milne-Watson (LLD)

1925
 Dame Sidney Jane Browne (Diploma in Nursing)
 Princess Mary, Viscountess Lascelles(LLD)
 Mary Rundle, (Diploma in Nursing)
 Sir Arthur Stanley (LLD)

1924
 Edmund George Arnold (LLD)
 Arthur Balfour (LLD)
 George Robinson Brench (MA)
 Col. Stephenson Robert Clarke (LLD)
 Emeritus Professor Julius Behrend Cohen (DSc)
 Emeritus Professor John Edwin Eddison (DSc)
 William Foot Husband (LLD)
 Sir Percy Jackson (LLD)
 Joseph Lowden (LLD)
 Professor Sir Berkeley Moynihan (LLD)
 Hannah Robertson (DLitt)
 Sir Michael Sadler (DLitt)
 Herbert Thompson (DLitt)

1923
 Sir Edward Allen Brotherton (LLD)
 Major John William Dent (LLD)
 Lawrence Dundas, Marquess of Zetland (DLitt)
 Frank Kidson (MA)
 William Mayo (DSc)
 Frederick Peaker (MA)
 Professor Arthur Smithells (DSc)
 Edwin Talbot (LLD)
 James Williams (LLD)
 Sir Charles Henry Wilson (LLD)
 Sir William Henry Worsley (LLD)

1922
 David Beatty (LLD)
 Henry Illingworth Bowring (LLD)
 Benjamin Broadbent (LLD)
 Maurice de Broglie, Duc de Broglie (DSc)
 Sir Dugald Clerk (DSc)
 Edith Bessie Cook (MA)
 Sir Frank Watson Dyson (DSc)
 David Lloyd George (LLD)
 Sir Richard Arman Gregory (DSc)
 Richard William Haydon (MSc)
 Rev. Bernard Horner (MA)
 Henry McLaren (LLD)
 Sir Arthur Peake (LLD)
 Carl Peterson (DSc)
 Sir Bruce Richmond (DLitt)
 Sir Charles Sherrington (DSc)
 Sir Harold Stiles (DSc)
 Rt. Rev. Thomas Strong (DLitt)
 Charles Francis Tetley (LLD)
 Professor Pierre Weiss (DSc)
 Archibald Wheeler (MA)

1920
 William Henry Barber (LLD)
 John Bickersteth (LLD)
 Rev. Canon John Neale Dalton (LLD)
 Peter Macintyre Evans (LLD)
 Sir Douglas Haig (LLD)

1910s
1919
 John Gilbert Baker (DSc)
 Sir William Henry Bragg (DSc)
 John Rawlinson Ford (LLD)
 Francis Vaughan Hall (MA)
 Sir Charles Holmes (DLitt)
 Sir Henry Jackson (DSc)
 Sir Alfred Keogh (DSc)
 Charles Lupton (LLD)
 John Mews (LLD)
 General Sir Herbert Charles Plumer (LLD)
 Sir Almroth Wright (DSc)

1917

 Herbert Austin Fricker (MA)

1915
 David Forsyth (LLD)
 Rev. Charles Hargrove (DLitt)
 Thomas Nelson (MSc)
 William Roebuck (MSc)
 Thomas Sheppard (MSc)
 John William Taylor (MSc)
 Harold Wager (DSc)
 Rev. Philip Wicksteed (DLitt)
 John Grimshaw Wilkinson (MSc)
 Thomas Woodhead (MSc)

1914
 Thomas Scales Carter (MSc)
 Emeritus Professor Henry Procter (DSc)
 Emeritus Professor Charles Vaughan (DLitt)
 Emile Verhaeren (DLitt)

1912
 Charles Carpenter (DSc)
 Arthur Cooper (LLD)
 Anna Paulina Eddison (LLD)
 Sir William Edward Garforth (LLD)
 Adolph Greiner (DSc)
 Sir Robert Hadfield (DSc)
 Rev. William Keeling (LLD)
 Thomas Newbigging (DSc)
 Sir Swire Smith (LLD)
 Kommerzienrat Friedrich Springorum (DSc)
 John Stead (DSc)
 Sir Corbert Woodall (DSc)

1910
 H. H. Asquith (LLD)
 Sir Hugh Bell (LLD)
 Victor Cavendish, 9th Duke of Devonshire (LLD)
 Henry Petty-Fitzmaurice, 5th Marquess of Lansdowne (LLD)
 Francis John Haverfield (DLitt)
 Sir Alfred Hopkinson (LLD)
 James Lowther (LLD)
 Arthur Lupton (LLD)
 Sir Clements Markham (DSc)
 Robert Offley Ashburton Crewe-Milnes (LLD)
 William Nicholson (LLD)
 Sir William Osler (DSc)
 Arthur Sidgwick (DLitt)
 John Strutt (Lord Rayleigh) (DSc)

1900s
1909
 Sir James Crichton-Browne (DSc)
 Thomas Walter Harding (LLD)
 Baron Lang of Lambeth (Cosmo Gordon Lang) (LLD)
 Ronald Ross (DSc)

1907
 Robert Collyer (DLitt)

1906
 Sir Thomas Clifford Allbutt (DSc)
 Heinrich Caro (DSc)
 William Boyd Carpenter (DLitt)
 Alfred Grandidier (DSc)
 Albin Haller (DSc)
 Sir Charles Holroyd (DLitt)
 Sir Edwin Lankester (DSc)
 Beilby Lawley (LLD)
 Carl Liebermann (DSc)
 Carl Von Martius (DSc)
 Paul Pelseneer (DSc)
 Sir William Perkin (DSc)
 Sir Owen Roberts (LLD)
 Heinrich Rubens (DSc)
 Thomas Percy Sykes (MA)
 Herbert Hall Turner (DSc)

1904
 Sir Arthur Herbert Dyke Acland (LLD)
 Tempest Anderson (DSc)
 Alfred Austin (DLitt)
 Sir John Barran (LLD)
 Sir Isaac Lowthian Bell (DSc)
 Sir William Bousfield (LLD)
 Sir William Henry Broadbent (DSc)
 Lady Frederick Cavendish (LLD)
 The Duke of Devonshire (Spencer Compton Cavendish) (LLD)
 Richard Assheton Cross (LLD)
 William Dalrymple Maclagan (Archbishop of York) (LLD)
 Sir Henry Walford Davies (LLD)
 Sir Edward Elgar (LLD)
 Rev. Andrew Martin Fairbairn (DLitt)
 Charles George Milnes Gaskell (LLD)
 Sir Jonathan Hutchinson (DSc)
 John Hughlings Jackson (DSc)
 William Jackson (LLD)
 Sir James Kitson (DSc)
 Henry Lascelles, 5th Earl of Harewood (LLD)
 Marmaduke Francis Constable-Maxwell (LLD)
 Professor Louis Miall (DSc)
 Sir Charles Hubert Parry (LLD)
 Lawrence Parsons (DSc)
 Sir Francis Powell (LLD)
 Sir Arthur Mayo-Robson (DSc)
 Sir Arthur Rollit (DLitt)
 Sir Arthur Rucker (DSc)
 Sir Charles Villiers Stanford (LLD)
 Thomas Teale (DSc)
 William Thomson (DSc)
 Sir Edward Thorpe (DSc)
 Claudius Wheelhouse (DSc)
 Charles Wood (LLD)
 Joseph Wright (DLitt)

Sources

References

Honorary graduates
Lists of honorary degree recipients
England education-related lists